Butantã may refer to:

 Subprefecture of Butantã, São Paulo
 Butantã (district of São Paulo)
 Butantã station, São Paulo Metrô
 Instituto Butantan